Agyneta metropolis is a species of sheet weaver found in Kenya. It was described by Russell-Smith & Jocqué in 1986.

References

Endemic fauna of Kenya
metropolis
Arthropods of Kenya
Spiders of Africa
Spiders described in 1986